
This is a timeline of the history of the Pontifical and Royal University of Santo Tomas, the oldest university in Asia, comprising important events of the history of the university and of the development of Philippine higher education in general. To read about the background to these events, see History of the University of Santo Tomas. See also the history of the Rector Magnificus of the University of Santo Tomas, and the Santo Tomas Internment Camp

 Centuries: 16th17th18th19th20th21st

16th century

17th century

18th century

19th century

20th century

21st century

Notes

References

External links
University of Santo Tomas - Official website
UST Miguel de Benavides Library
UST Museum of Arts and Sciences

University of Santo Tomas
Santo Tomas
Santo Tomas
University of Santo Tomas